Fayetteville Downtown Historic District is a national historic district located in Fayetteville, Cumberland County, North Carolina.  It encompasses 113 contributing buildings, 3 contributing sites, 1 contributing structure, and 2 contributing objects in the central business district of Fayetteville.  The district includes commercial buildings, government and civic buildings, railroad-related structures, residential dwellings, churches and the Cross Creek Cemetery. They range in build date from the 1780s to 1949. The district includes the previously listed Liberty Row and Market House Square District and 16 resources listed as part of the "Historic Resources of Fayetteville," a Multiple Resource Nomination.

It was listed on the National Register of Historic Places in 1999.

References

Historic districts on the National Register of Historic Places in North Carolina
Neoclassical architecture in North Carolina
Buildings and structures in Fayetteville, North Carolina
National Register of Historic Places in Cumberland County, North Carolina